Crambus tenuis is a moth in the family Crambidae. It was described by Graziano Bassi in 1992. It is found in Cameroon.

References

Crambini
Moths described in 1992
Moths of Africa